Fernán Gutiérrez de Castro (1180–1233) was a Spanish nobleman, Lord of Lemos and Sarria, Alférez real during the Kingdom of Castile.

Biography 
Fernán was born in Spain, the son of Gutierre Rodríguez de Castro and Elvira Osorio. His wife was Milia Íñiguez daughter of Íñigo López de Mendoza and María García

References 

1180 births
1223 deaths
12th-century nobility from León and Castile
13th-century Castilians
Spanish Roman Catholics